Revista de Administração de Empresas (often RAE) is a peer-reviewed open-access academic journal established in 1961 covering business management and administration. It is published by the Escola de Administração de Empresas de São Paulo and the editor-in-chief is Jorge Carneiro.

History
The first issue contained contributions by foreign authors, several linked to the Michigan State University, an institution that participated in the foundation and development of the Escola de Administração de Empresas de São Paulo. The first editor was Raimar Richers (Escola de Administração de Empresas de São Paulo).

References

External links

Business and management journals
Publications established in 1961
Continuous journals
Multilingual journals
Creative Commons Attribution-licensed journals